Machaela Marie George (born October 3, 1997) is an American professional soccer player who last played as a defender for Liga BPI club SC Braga.

Club career 
George made her NWSL debut on May 23, 2021. She was waived on September 29, 2021.

References

External links 
 
 Santa Clara profile

1997 births
Living people
OL Reign players
Santa Clara Broncos women's soccer players
Fortuna Hjørring players
National Women's Soccer League players
American women's soccer players
Women's association football defenders
Expatriate women's footballers in Portugal
Expatriate women's footballers in Denmark
American expatriate sportspeople in Portugal
American expatriate sportspeople in Denmark
American expatriate women's soccer players
S.C. Braga (women's football) players